The Americas Zone was one of the three regional zones of the 1971 Davis Cup.

13 teams entered the Americas Zone: 5 teams competed in the North & Central America Zone, while 8 teams competed in the South America Zone. The winner of each sub-zone would play against each other to determine who moved to the Inter-Zonal Zone to compete against the winners of the Eastern Zone and Europe Zone.

Mexico defeated New Zealand in the North & Central America Zone final, and Brazil defeated Chile in the South America Zone final. In the Americas Inter-Zonal Final, Brazil defeated Mexico and progressed to the Inter-Zonal Zone.

North & Central America Zone

Draw

Quarterfinals
Mexico vs. South Korea

Semifinals
Mexico vs. Canada

Caribbean/West Indies vs. New Zealand

Final
Mexico vs. New Zealand

South America Zone

Draw

Quarterfinals
Brazil vs. Bolivia

Ecuador vs. Venezuela

Uruguay vs. Argentina

Colombia vs. Chile

Semifinals
Brazil vs. Ecuador

Chile vs. Argentina

Final
Chile vs. Brazil

Americas Inter-Zonal Final
Mexico vs. Brazil

References

External links
Davis Cup official website

Davis Cup Americas Zone
America Zone
Davis Cup
Davis Cup
Davis Cup
Davis Cup
Davis Cup